{{DISPLAYTITLE:C11H15ClO2}}
The molecular formula C11H15ClO2 (molar mass: 214.69 g/mol, exact mass: 214.0761 u) may refer to:

 Metaglycodol
 Phenaglycodol

Molecular formulas